Cameron Park may refer to:

Places 
 Cameron Park, California, United States
 Cameron Park Historic District in Raleigh, North Carolina, United States
 Cameron Park, New South Wales, Australia
 Cameron Park, Texas, United States
 Cameron Park Zoo, in Waco, Texas
 Cameron Park (Waco), in Waco, Texas

People 
 Cameron Park (footballer) (born 1992), English association football player